2021 FIS Freestyle Ski and Snowboarding Junior World Championships are the Junior World Championships in freestyle skiing and snowboarding organized by the International Ski Federation (FIS).

Medals

See also
 FIS Freestyle World Ski Championships
 FIS Freestyle Junior World Ski Championships
 FIS Snowboarding World Championships
 FIS Snowboarding Junior World Championships

References

External links
International Ski Federation - Calendar & Results

International Ski Federation competitions
World youth sports competitions
Freestyle skiing competitions
Freestyle Junior
Snowboarding competitions